E 015 is a European B class road in Kazakhstan, connecting the cities Taskesken - Bakhty.

Route 

Taskesken
Bakhty

External links 
 UN Economic Commission for Europe: Overall Map of E-road Network (2007)

International E-road network
European routes in Kazakhstan